Robert L'Heureux (born May 27, 1940) is an American politician in the state of New Hampshire. He was a member of the New Hampshire House of Representatives, sitting as a Republican from the Hillsborough 21 district from 2016 to 2020. He previously served from 1990 to 2010.

References

Living people
1940 births
Republican Party members of the New Hampshire House of Representatives
Politicians from Manchester, New Hampshire
People from Merrimack, New Hampshire
20th-century American politicians
21st-century American politicians